Lee Tien-chu (7 November 1956), also known as Mark Lee, is a Taiwanese actor.

He has appeared on stage, notably in a 2001 Taiwanese adaptation of Black Comedy, and in the 2010 production The Waste Land, alongside Akira Chen. Lee was given the Golden Bell Award for Best Actor in a Television Series in 2006. Ten years later, he was awarded the Golden Bell Award for Best Actor in a Miniseries or Television Film in October 2016. During the time allotted for his acceptance speech, Lee, a Christian, led the audience in prayer. In an interview after the ceremony, he commented on homosexuality, stating "I don’t hate gay people. I love them, and I also have compassion for them. But I have to say that [being gay] is wrong." Lee's later statements were harsher, as he said "I’ll be open about it. I don’t support homosexuality because it’s going to lead to the destruction of humanity and that of the nation," as well as "I won’t betray my faith just for a little money. This is wrong. Homosexuality is a huge curse to our future generations."

Selected filmography
Lovers Under the Rain (1986)
Deep Garden (1987)
One Side of the Water (1988)
The Rule of the Game (2002)
The Glory of Tang Dynasty (2017)

References

External links

1956 births
Living people
Taiwanese male stage actors
Taiwanese male television actors
21st-century Taiwanese male actors
20th-century Taiwanese male actors
Taiwanese Christians